The 2022–23 Biathlon World Cup – Stage 1 was the first event of the season and was held in Kontiolahti, Finland, from 29 November to 4 December 2022. The event consisted of three individual competitions and one relay for both genders. World cup leaders after the events in Kontiolahti were Johannes Thingnes Bø for men and Lisa Vittozzi for the women.

Schedule of events 
The events took place at the following times.

Medal winners

Men

Women

References 

Biathlon World Cup - Stage 1, 2022-23
2022–23 Biathlon World Cup
Biathlon World Cup - Stage 1
Biathlon World Cup - Stage 1
Biathlon competitions in Finland